David King Alderdice  OBE MA (Oxon) FRCPI is a former Lord Mayor of Belfast  and senior member of the Alliance Party of Northern Ireland.

Early life and personal 
Born into a Presbyterian manse, Alderdice was educated at Ballymena Academy. His middle name, ”King” is after his great, great, grand uncle, John King, a 19th-century Australian explorer and the sole survivor of the Burke and Wills expedition. He graduated in Medicine from Queen's University Belfast in 1989 and worked as a junior doctor in the Royal Victoria Hospital in Belfast. He moved to Oxford where he read PPE (1992–94) at Harris Manchester College Oxford. He was an Elder in the Presbyterian Church in Ireland until 2019 when he resigned citing the narrowing of spiritual outlook in PCI and its intolerance of minorities as the reasons for leaving. He is currently a communicant member of First Church Belfast which is the city’s oldest surviving place of worship. His brother is John Alderdice, Baron Alderdice.

Professional 
As a trainee doctor he worked in Belfast, Oxfordshire and London. He was appointed as Consultant Dermatologist in 2002 initially working in the Causeway Trust (Northern Ireland) and then he moved to the South Eastern Trust in 2010. He is Clinical Director for Cancer Services (South Eastern Trust), Consultant Dermatologist and runs the Northern Ireland Regional Psychodermatology service.

Political career 
He joined the Alliance Party in 1985 and was active in Young Alliance and Queens Alliance. He first ran for political office in Ballymena Borough Council elections while a medical student in 1989. He was the first Belfast City Councillor to be elected Lord Mayor of Belfast with votes from both Unionist and Nationalist Councillors. He welcomed many visitors and heads of state to the City in the period after the signing of the Good Friday Agreement, including Vaclav Havel, Mary Robinson and Bill Clinton. 

During his time as Lord Mayor of Belfast, dissident republicans detonated the Omagh bomb, the worst atrocity of The Troubles, killing 29 individuals. As leader of the Alliance Party City Hall group, Alderdice took the controversial decision to vote for Councillor Alex Maskey of Sinn Féin to be Lord Mayor in 2002 which resulted in violence from loyalists upon his family and home. He stood down from elected office after submitting his resignation in July 2010 which came into effect at the end of the month.

Honours 
He was awarded an OBE in 1999 for services to local government.

References 

Mayors of Belfast
1966 births
Living people